The 2006 Zakouma elephant slaughter refers to a series of poaching massacres of African elephants in the vicinity of Zakouma National Park in southeastern Chad.  These killings were documented in aerial surveys conducted from May through August 2006 and total at least 100 animals. This region has a four decade history of illegal killing of this species; in fact, the Chad population was over 300,000 animals as recently as 1970 and has been reduced to approximately 10,000 as of 2006. The African elephant nominally has Chadian governmental protection, but the implementation practices of the government (backed with certain EU help) have been insufficient to stem the slaughter by poachers.  The African Bush Elephant (Loxodonta africana) species occurs in several countries of Eastern and Central Africa.

The most recent aerial surveys were conducted from August 3–11, 2006, overseen by J. Michael Fay, a Wildlife Conservation Society conservationist and National Geographic explorer-in-residence. They found five separate massacre sites. Zakouma is considered "one of the last bastions of wildlife in all of central Africa".  Commissioned by the government of Chad and Project CRUSSE (Conservation and Rational Utilization of Sudan-Sahelian Ecosystems), Fay conducted surveys  In 2005 and 2006 of elephants within Zakouma, and found populations to decline from 3885 to 3020 animals, significantly offsetting the precipitous increase of the previous six months, although the counting error could not be fully assessed.

Reporting details
Fay reported that he saw five men at a base camp, who ran when his airplane approached. At another time he saw one man on horseback with an automatic weapon, who fired on his airplane.  "Zakouma elephants are getting massacred right before our eyes.", Fay relayed to reporters. "We hadn't been in the air more than two hours when we saw our first carcass. It was fresh, maybe just a few weeks old, not far from the park headquarters, and the animal's face had been chopped off, the tusks removed."   Fay and National Geographic photographer Michael Nichols documented what they found in Ivory Wars, Last Stand in Zakouma.

History of Zakouma National Park

Zakouma National Park is located between Sarh and Am Timan, in the southeastern part of Chad. Created in 1963, it was Chad's first national park, and has an area of almost 3000 square kilometres. It is entirely surrounded by the Bahr Salamat Faunal Reserve.  Zakouma was neglected during the period of civil conflict, but a restoration programme, supported by the European Union, began in 1989 and is continuing in 2006.

Elephants within the park have protection from the Chadian government, but the elephants who migrate outside Zakouma to forage in the rainy season, are not subject to the same patrol protection as within the park. According to Stephen Sautner of the Wildlife Conservation Society: "All hunting of elephants in Chad is illegal, and the sale of ivory has been banned since 1989, though black-market trade is increasing."

Logistics of ivory trade

Killing elephants for ivory has been a major cause of the decline of the African elephant population since at least the 1970s.  Most of the ivory harvested is imported into China and Thailand.  For example, between 1996 and 2002 forty-five tonnes of ivory in transit to China were seized by authorities.  China agreed to reduce imports of ivory; however  Chinese official Chen Jianwei has indicated that many Chinese people are confused about the legality of ivory imports.

Relation to regional conflict

Zakouma is about 260 kilometres west of the conflict area of Darfur, and is in the path of recent warfare in Chad, thus overall security is low and the national border is "porous in this isolated region."

Conservation action

In response to this devastating event, The WILD Foundation partnered with The Wildlife Conservation Society and others to deter and detain poachers using aircraft surveillance.  The aircraft will focus on park borders, where elephants are not protected.

See also
Biodiversity Action Plan
Extinction
Ivory

References

External links
 Ivory Wars, produced by Mediastorm

Zakouma elephant slaughter
2006 in the environment
Animal cruelty incidents
Elephant conservation
Environmental disasters in Africa
Environmental issues in Chad
Ivory
Nature conservation in Chad
Poaching